Silver Springs is an unincorporated community in St. Francois County, in the U.S. state of Missouri.

History
A post office called Silver Spring was established in 1850, and remained in operation until 1860. The community took its name from a spring near the original town site.

References

Unincorporated communities in St. Francois County, Missouri
Unincorporated communities in Missouri